The Koszta Affair (1853) was the name applied to a diplomatic episode between the United States and the Austrian Empire involving the rights in foreign countries of new Americans who were not yet fully naturalized.

Background
Martin Koszta, a man of Hungarian birth, had taken part in the political movement of 1848-49 to separate Hungary from the Austrian Empire. He fled to Turkey, then emigrated to the United States. In July 1852, he made a declaration under oath of his intention to become a citizen of the United States and, at the same time, renounced all allegiance to any foreign power.

Abduction
After residing in the United States for a year and eleven months, Koszta returned to Turkey on private business. He was placed under the protection of the United States by the American consul at Smyrna and the American chargé d'affaires ad interim at Constantinople. While waiting to return to the United States, Koszta was captured by Austrian officers and taken by force aboard the Austrian brig-of-war Huszár and confined in chains. United States officials protested in vain to the Turkish government and the Austrian officers.

Americans learned of rumors that the prisoner was to be transported secretly to Trieste. Under instructions from the American Minister at Constantinople, Captain Duncan Ingraham of the United States sloop-of-war Saint Louis, which was then lying in Smyrna harbor, on July 2, 1853, threatened to open fire on the Huszar if Koszta was not surrendered to him by four o'clock. The Austrian consul general agreed to allow Koszta to be held by the consul general of France until some agreement with the United States could be reached.

Diplomacy
On August 29, 1853, Baron Hülsemann, the Austrian chargé d'affaires in Washington, wrote to Secretary of State William L. Marcy, asking for the United States to "disavow the conduct of its agents, ... hasten to call them to a severe account, and tender to Austria a satisfaction proportionate to the outrage." He said that Koszta was not a naturalized citizen of the US and had never ceased to be a citizen of Austria. Ingraham's threat was thus in violation of international law.

Marcy replied on September 26, 1853, in what is known as the Hülsemann letter. He defended the position of the United States throughout on the ground that Koszta had ceased to be a citizen of Austria even by the law of Austria. His letter said;

that Koszta when seized and imprisoned was invested with the nationality of the United States, and they had therefore the right, if they chose to exercise it, to extend their protection to him; that from international law – the only law which can be rightfully appealed to for rules in this case – Austria could derive no authority to obstruct or interfere with the United States in the exercise of this right, in effecting the liberation of Koszta; and that Captain Ingraham's interposition for his release was, under the extraordinary circumstances of the case, right and proper.

The letter was published, to great enthusiasm throughout the United States. The State Department's position in relation to the status of immigrants who were not fully naturalized has been endorsed by various well-known authorities on international law.

Koszta was ultimately released by Austria and allowed to return to the United States. The United States Congress passed a joint resolution of thanks to Captain Ingraham and decorated him with the Congressional Gold Medal, in commemoration of his services.

References

Further reading
 Correspondence between the Secretary of State and the chargé d'affaires of Austria relative to the case of Martin Koszta (Washington, 1853)
 
 Rhoades, J. F., History of the United States from the Compromise of 1850 (New York, 1910)

1853 in the United States
1853 in the Ottoman Empire
History of immigration to the United States
Austria–United States relations
Diplomatic incidents
Kidnappings
International maritime incidents
Military diplomacy
History of İzmir
United States Navy in the 19th century